The Freckleton Half Marathon is an annual road running event held in Freckleton, Lancashire, United Kingdom.
The event was the idea of the then chairman of the local sport committee who was inspired by Ron Hill's performance in the 1964 Summer Olympics, and Ron accepted the invitation to run. Ron won that first race and later described the distance "The half marathon is a great distance, as you can push yourself almost flat out without the risk of blowing up". Ron returned to Freckleton in 2007, aged 70, and wore the race number 65 in honour of the first year.

The race provided three of the first six world records at this relatively new Half Marathon distance, two achieved by Ron Hill in 1965 and 1969, and one by Pete Ravald in 1966.

Ben Fish of Blackurn Harriers and Team Fish holds the record for the most wins with a record nine wins in nine years m.

The race is probably the oldest continuously running Half Marathon event in the UK, after the demise of the Romford Half Marathon and The Morpeth.

Winners

Year by year:

References

External links
 Official website

Half marathons in the United Kingdom
Recurring sporting events established in 1965
1965 establishments in England
Sport in the Borough of Fylde